Frazey Obadiah Ford is a Canadian singer-songwriter and actress. She was a founding member of The Be Good Tanyas. Her solo debut Obadiah was released on Nettwerk on July 20, 2010.

Jenny Charlesworth of The Georgia Straight wrote that a few of the songs "swing with a mellow neo-soul beat enlivened by buttery vocals", and noted influences from rhythm and blues singers Ann Peebles, Roberta Flack, and Donny Hathaway. Ford also credits her free-spirited parents (her father was an American conscientious objector who moved to Canada), and being a mother has had a strong influence on her songwriting.

Obadiah takes its name from Ford's middle name, Obadiah. When she was born, her parents asked her brothers to choose her middle name; they decided to name her after their pet cat Obadiah that had recently run away.

Ford was raised in Castlegar, British Columbia. She currently resides in Vancouver.

Discography
Obadiah (2010)
Indian Ocean (2014)
U Kin B the Sun (2020)

Filmography
 The L Word (TV episode, 2006) as Sister Christine
 The Christmas Calendar (2017) as Ivy

References

External links

 
 
  
 
 Frazey Ford at Nettwerk

Year of birth missing (living people)
Living people
People from Castlegar, British Columbia
Canadian alternative country singers
Canadian women singer-songwriters
Canadian country singer-songwriters
Canadian folk singer-songwriters
Musicians from Vancouver
21st-century Canadian women singers
Nettwerk Music Group artists